The 2019–20 Florida Atlantic Owls men's basketball team represented Florida Atlantic University in the 2019–20 NCAA Division I men's basketball season. The Owls, led by 2nd-year head coach Dusty May, played their home games at FAU Arena in Boca Raton, Florida as members of Conference USA. They finished the season 17–15, 8–10 in C-USA play to finish in ninth place. They defeated Old Dominion in the first round of the C-USA tournament and were set to take on North Texas in the quarterfinals. However, the remainder of the tournament was canceled amid the COVID-19 pandemic.

Previous season
The Owls finished the 2018–19 season 17–16 overall, 8–10 in C-USA play to finish in a four-way tie for 9th place. In the C-USA tournament, they were defeated by Louisiana Tech in the first round. They were invited to the CIT, where they lost to Charleston Southern in the first round.

Roster

Schedule and results

|-
!colspan=12 style=| Exhibition

|-
!colspan=12 style=| Non-conference regular season

|-
!colspan=12 style=| Conference USA regular season

|-
!colspan=9 style=| Conference USA tournament
|-

|-

|-

Source

Notes

References

Florida Atlantic Owls men's basketball seasons
Florida Atlantic Owls
Florida Atlantic Owls men's basketball
Florida Atlantic Owls men's basketball